The following sortable table lists land surface elevation extremes by country or dependent territory.

Topographic elevation is the vertical distance above the reference geoid, a mathematical model of the Earth's sea level as an equipotential gravitational surface.

Table

National elevation ranges
Other countries with high low points include Rwanda  and Andorra . Countries with very low high points include Maldives , Tuvalu,  and the Marshall Islands . These island countries also have the smallest range between their lowest (sea level) and highest points, and are very sensitive to changes in sea level.

The elevation ranges are also great in Nepal , Pakistan , and India .

Monaco's elevation range is among the greatest relative to surface area. Within its 2.02 km2 territory, there is a difference of 140 m between its highest and lowest points, giving a ratio of 69 m for every km2.

Gallery

See also

List of elevation extremes by region
List of highest points of African countries
List of highest points of Asian countries
List of highest points of European countries
List of highest points of Oceanian countries
Geodesy
Geoid
Nadir
Summit
Topographic elevation
Topographic isolation
Topographic prominence
List of countries by average elevation
List of sovereign states
List of U.S. states by elevation
:Category:Highest points
:Category:Lowest points

Notes

References

External links

United Kingdom
Foreign and Commonwealth Office
Country profiles
United States of America
The Library of Congress
Country Studies
U.S. Central Intelligence Agency
The World Factbook
U.S. Department of State
Background Notes

Elevation
Highest points
Lowest points
Elevation Extremes
Elevation Extremes
Elevation Extremes
Elevation Extremes